The women's individual competition at the 2006 Asian Games in Doha was held from 8 December to 11 December at the Doha Golf Club. The Ladies played at 5751 yards with a par 73.

Schedule
All times are Arabia Standard Time (UTC+03:00)

Results 
Legend
DSQ — Disqualified

References 

Results
Results

Golf at the 2006 Asian Games
2006 in women's golf